Siamak Dadashi (born 13 July 1974) is an Iranian professional futsal coach and former player. He is currently assistant coach of Iran.

Honours

Country 
 AFC Futsal Championship
 Champion (5): 2000 - 2001 - 2002 - 2003 - 2004

Club

Individual

References

External links 
 
 

1974 births
Living people
Sportspeople from Tehran
Iranian men's futsal players
Futsal forwards
Iranian futsal coaches
Esteghlal FSC players
Shahid Mansouri FSC players
Shensa Saveh FSC players